Puxian may refer to:

 Puxian Min, subcategory of Min Chinese
 Puxian Pavilion, at Shanhua Temple in Datong, Shanxi Province, China
 Puxian Pusa, a Bodhisattva in Mahayana Buddhism
 Puxian Wannu, 13th-century Jurchen warlord
 Pu County, or Puxian, in Shanxi, China
 Putian, or Puxian, a city in Fujian province, China
 Puxian people